

X 

 
 411 Xanthe
 156 Xanthippe
 
 4544 Xanthus
 
 
 
 625 Xenia
 
 
 
 
 
 
 
 
 
 
 
 
 
 
 
 
 
 
 
 
 
 
 
 
 
 
 
 
 
 
 1506 Xosa

See also 
 List of minor planet discoverers
 List of observatory codes

References 
 

Lists of minor planets by name